Juan de Garchitorena de Carvajal, known in cinema as Juan Torena (1898–1983), was a Spanish-Filipino footballer and actor. After emigrating to Argentina at a young age, he became a footballer who eventually played for the Spanish club FC Barcelona. Later in his life, he went to North America where he acted in Hollywood films, appearing in both English and Spanish-language versions. He was married to the actress Natalie Moorhead.

Selected filmography
 Shadows of Glory (1930)
 Road of Hell (1931)
 There Were Thirteen (1931)
 Nothing More Than a Woman (1934)
 La cruz y la espada (1934)
 Storm Over the Andes (1935)
 The Devil on Horseback (1936)
 Captain Calamity (1936)
 Espionage (1937)
 Mis dos amores  (1938)
 American Guerrilla in the Philippines (1950)

References

Bibliography 
 Jarvinen, Lisa. The Rise of Spanish-language Filmmaking: Out from Hollywood's Shadow, 1929-1939. Rutger's University Press, 2012.

External links 
 
 

1898 births
1983 deaths
Argentine male film actors
Argentine footballers
Filipino male film actors
Filipino footballers
Footballers from Metro Manila
Sportspeople from Manila
Male actors from Manila
Association footballers not categorized by position
Filipino emigrants to the United States